Nolan "Nonie" Williams (born May 22, 1998) is an American former professional baseball shortstop.

Williams was home-schooled, but took one class at Turner High School in Kansas City, Kansas, in order to be eligible to play baseball for their team, where he was Kansas Class 5A Player of the Year in 2015. He reclassified to the college class of 2016 and accepted a baseball scholarship from Louisiana State University. After the Los Angeles Angels selected him in the third round of the 2016 Major League Baseball draft, using the 96th overall pick, he signed with the Angels for an above-slot bonus and began his professional career.

Before the start of the 2017 season, MLB.com prospect analyst Jonathan Mayo ranked Williams as the 13th-best prospect in the Angels' farm system. He was released on June 5, 2020.

Williams is a switch hitter.

References

External links

1998 births
Living people
Baseball players from Kansas
Arizona League Angels players
Orem Owlz players
Sportspeople from Kansas City, Kansas
Baseball shortstops